The Ostrich Politic is a 2018 French computer-animated short film directed by HouHou during his studies at Gobelins, l'École de l'image French animation school.

Plot 
This short film, delivered with a poetic narration, follows ostriches carrying on their daily activities burying their heads, believing It's an instinctive behavior. However, one day a research by phylogeneticist Dr. Kays proves otherwise.

Distribution
The short was acquired and broadcast online by ARTE channel and seen more than a million times online.

Accolades
The short has been selected and awarded at several film festivals including Clermont-Ferrand International Short Film Festival, the Annecy International Animated Film Festival, and the LA shorts Fest where it won the Oscar Qualifying prize for "Best Animation".

It was also a Finalist at the Student Academy Awards and the  BAFTA Student Film Awards for best student film in 2019.

References

External links 
 
 
 

2018 films
2018 short films
2018 computer-animated films
2010s animated short films
French computer-animated films
French animated short films
Animated films about birds
Fictional flightless birds
2010s French films